Auroraceratops, meaning "dawn horned face", is a genus of bipedal basal neoceratopsian dinosaur, from the Early Cretaceous (Aptian age) of north central China. The etymology of the generic name refers to its status as an early ceratopsian and also to Dawn Dodson, wife of Peter Dodson, one of the palaeontologists who described it.

Discovery and species
The first specimen was found in the Xinminpu Group, Gongpoquan Basin of the Mazong Shan area of Gansu Province, north central China. As of 2021, fossils from more than 80 more individuals have been found, including complete skeletons.

The specific descriptor, "rugosus", Latin for "rough", refers to the various rugose areas on the surface of both skull and jaw, namely the wrinkled expansion of the lacrimal bone distinctive of this animal. Auroraceratops is the second basal neoceratopsian to be found in the Mazong Shan area, after Archaeoceratops.

The type specimen, IG-2004-VD-001, consists of a nearly complete subadult skull lacking the rostral bone and parietal crest.

Description
Though most other neoceratopsians are characterized by a long, narrow snout, Auroraceratops has a shorter wider one. The  skull itself is rather flat and wide. The premaxillae have at least two pairs of striated fang-like teeth. Paired rugose areas, very probably covered in keratin in life, are in front of the eyes and on the jugal with corresponding areas on the lower jaw. These roughened knobs were likely to have been used for inter- and intra-specific interactions. While they would not have been much use as a physical defense against predators, another possible function for these structures would be in pushing or butting contests between members of the same species either for mating rights or social disputes.

Auroraceratops is a rather derived moderate-sized basal neoceratopsian that adds diversity to that clade, displaying skull features not present in Archaeoceratops or Liaoceratops.

See also

 Timeline of ceratopsian research

References

Ceratopsians
Early Cretaceous dinosaurs of Asia
Aptian life
Paleontology in Gansu
Fossils of South Korea
Fossil taxa described in 2005
Taxa named by Peter Dodson
Ornithischian genera